The Irish League in season 1968–69 comprised 12 teams, and Linfield won the championship.

League standings

Results

References
Northern Ireland - List of final tables (RSSSF)

NIFL Premiership seasons
1968–69 in Northern Ireland association football
Northern